The Order of Lapu-Lapu is a national order of merit conferred by the President of the Philippines to officials and personnel of the government and private individuals in recognition of invaluable or extraordinary service in relation to a campaign or advocacy of the President. As a presidential award that is not included in the Honors Code of the Philippines, it ranks below the Presidential Medal of Merit.

Ranks 
Under Executive Order No. 17 signed by President Rodrigo Duterte, the Order of Lapu-Lapu had three ranks: Lapu-Lapu Medal, Kalasag Medal and Kampilan Medal. This was increased to four under Executive Order No. 35 as follows:

Magalong Medal 
The Magalong Medal is awarded to officials and personnel of the government and private individuals who have rendered extraordinary service or have made exceptional contributions to the success of an activity pursuant to a campaign or advocacy of the President.

Kalasag Medal 
The Kalasag Medal is awarded to officials and personnel of the government and private individuals who lost their lives as a direct result of their participation in an activity pursuant to a campaign or advocacy of the President.

Kampilan Medal 
The Kampilan Medal is awarded to officials and personnel of the government and private individuals who were seriously wounded or injured or suffered great loss of property as a direct result of their participation in an activity pursuant to a campaign or advocacy of the President.

Kamagi Medal 
The Kamagi Medal is awarded to officials and personnel of the government and private individuals who, not falling under any of the abovementioned ranks, actively participated in and contributed significantly to an activity pursuant to a campaign or advocacy of the President.

Description of the award 

The medals of the Order of Lapu-Lapu are manufactured by the Bangko Sentral ng Pilipinas and are made of 99.9% silver with selective gold plating depending on the rank. The ribbon is made of Philippine cotton hand-woven by a cooperative foundation in Bontoc, Mountain Province.

References 

Establishments by Philippine executive order